The Sunday River (in French: rivière Sunday) is a tributary of the Osgood River, whose course flows successively into the Palmer River and Bécancour River; the latter being in turn a tributary of the south shore of the St. Lawrence River.

The Sunday River flows through the municipalities of Kinnear's Mills and Saint-Jacques-de-Leeds, in the Les Appalaches Regional County Municipality (MRC), in the region administrative office of Chaudière-Appalaches, in Quebec, in Canada.

Geography 
The river, once a strong sinuosity, has a length of about  after linearization. The edges suffer from frequent erosion. The river is then diverted from its course, and the new meanders must be linearized again every three years. Also, the bed must be periodically freed from gravel deposits due to erosion. The river is rich in brook trout, but linearization work has compromised the integrity of the  habitat.

Toponymy 
The name of the Sunday River appears on a 1925 map, but the name probably comes from the construction of Craig Road around 1809. Due to a lack of local manpower, the Governor James Henry Craig made build the way by the military. The latter camped on Sundays near the stream, hence the English name "Sunday River". The toponym was formalized on December 17, 1993.

See also 
 List of rivers of Quebec

References

Works cited 

 ;
 

Rivers of Chaudière-Appalaches
Les Appalaches Regional County Municipality